Organic cotton is generally defined as cotton that is grown organically in subtropical countries such as India, Turkey, China, and parts of the USA from non-genetically modified plants, and without the use of any synthetic agricultural chemicals such as fertilizers or pesticides aside from the ones allowed by the certified organic labeling. Its production is supposed to promote and enhance biodiversity and biological cycles. In the United States, cotton plantations must also meet the requirements enforced by the National Organic Program (NOP) from the USDA in order to be considered organic.  This institution determines the allowed practices for pest control, growing, fertilizing, and handling of organic crops.

, 265,517 bales of organic cotton were produced in 24 countries and worldwide production was growing at a rate of more than 50% per year. In the 2016/2017 season, annual global production reached 3.2 million metric tonnes.

Ecological footprint
Cotton covers 2.5% of the world's cultivated land but uses 10-16% of the world's pesticides (including herbicides, insecticides, and defoliants), more than any other single major crop. Environmental consequences of the elevated use of chemicals in the non-organic cotton growing methods include the following:
Chemicals used in the processing of cotton pollute the air and surface waters.
Decreased biodiversity and shifting equilibrium of ecosystems due to the use of pesticides.

As is the case for any comparison between organic and "conventional" crops, care must be taken to standardise by yield rather than land area. Like many crops, yields (per hectare) in organic cotton farms are typically significantly lower compared to conventional methods; this yield gap means that the water used to produce the same amount of cotton fibre can in fact be higher in organic, compared to conventional cotton cultivation.

Pesticides 
If certified by the USDA, organic cotton is grown without the use of synthetic pesticides. However, organic growers are able to use a suite of organically approved pesticides, including pyrethrins from plant material, copper sulfate as a molluscicide and fungicide, and a range of insecticidal soaps, among others. Application rates of organic pesticides can often exceed those in conventional cultivation systems due in part to the large yield deficits in organic cropping systems, and organic pesticides can be at least as toxic as their conventional counterparts. By comparison, conventional cotton can be grown using a range of synthetic pesticides. Fields converted from conventional use to organic cotton must be tested to assure no residual pesticide with a transition period of 2–3 years in this process. In some cases, companies have taken to testing for pesticide residual of fiber or fabric themselves to assure cheating does not occur on the part of the farmers or farm coops. Use of insecticides, herbicides, fertilizers, and water have all declined in conventional systems as a direct result of the widespread adoption of genetically modified cotton, which currently accounts for over 95% of cotton grown in the U.S., India and China. Organic certification  prohibits use of genetically modified (GM) varieties.

Distribution of Organic Cotton Production
Organic cotton is only 1-2% of global cotton production, and is currently being grown in many countries. The largest producers (as of 2018) are India (51%), China (19%), Turkey (7%) and Kyrgyzstan (7%). Organic cotton production in Africa takes place in at least 8 countries. The earliest producer (1990) was the SEKEM organization in Egypt; the farmers involved later convinced the Egyptian government to convert 400,000 hectares of conventional cotton production to integrated methods, achieving a 90% reduction in the use of synthetic pesticides in Egypt and a 30% increase in yields.

Various industry initiatives aim to support organic growers, and various companies, including  Nike, Walmart, and C&A now incorporate organic cotton as part of their supply chains

See also 
 Fair trade
 Sustainable clothing
 Sustainable fashion
 Organic clothing

References

External links 

Cotton
Organic farming
Clothing and the environment